Tomáš Starosta (born May 20, 1981) is a Slovak professional ice hockey defenceman who is currently playing for HK Dukla Trenčín of the Slovak Extraliga. 

He participated at the 2010 IIHF World Championship as a member of the Slovakia men's national ice hockey team.

Career statistics

Regular season and playoffs

International

References

External links

1981 births
Living people
HK Dukla Trenčín players
Ice hockey players at the 2018 Winter Olympics
Olympic ice hockey players of Slovakia
Ice hockey players at the 2014 Winter Olympics
HC Neftekhimik Nizhnekamsk players
Salavat Yulaev Ufa players
Slovak ice hockey defencemen
HC Slovan Bratislava players
HC Yugra players
Sportspeople from Trenčín
Slovak expatriate ice hockey players in Russia